Stefan Stoyanov Grozdanov (born 13 March 1946) is a former Bulgarian footballer and football manager.

He has coached Bdin Vidin, Hebar Pazardzhik, Septemvri Sofia, Velbazhd Kyustendil, and Spartak Varna.

Lokomotiv Sofia
In 2004, he took charge of the coaching staff of Lokomotiv Sofia. With the club he achieved the record of 8 consecutive matches unbeaten in the European club competitions in the period of 2006-2007. He led the club to 3rd place in A PFG twice - in 2006/2007 and 2007/2008.

In mid-2008 he resigned from coaching Lokomotiv Sofia and after a year without coaching, returned to manage Pirin Blagoevgrad.

Montana
On 11 June 2011 he was appointed as manager of Montana. During his stay in charge of the team he stabilized the club at the 10th place in the A PFG. He resigned in early December 2011 for family reasons. He achieved 3 wins, 5 draws and 7 losses while at the helm of Montana.

References

1946 births
Living people
Bulgarian footballers
Bulgarian football managers
PFC Spartak Varna managers
PFC Levski Sofia managers
FC Etar Veliko Tarnovo players
PFC Hebar Pazardzhik managers
FC Lokomotiv 1929 Sofia managers
First Professional Football League (Bulgaria) players
Association footballers not categorized by position
FC Montana managers